Donnie Liboon Nietes (born May 12, 1982) is a Filipino professional boxer. He is a world champion in four weight-classes, having previously held the WBO mini-flyweight title from 2007 to 2011; the WBO and The Ring magazine junior-flyweight titles between 2011 and 2016; IBF flyweight title from 2017 to 2018; and the WBO junior-bantamweight title from 2018 to 2019. He is the longest-reigning Filipino boxing world champion, surpassing in 2014 the record set in 1967 by Boxing Hall of Fame inductee Gabriel "Flash" Elorde. He was one of the first three Asian fighters with world titles in at least four weight classes alongside fellow Filipinos Manny Pacquiao and Nonito Donaire.

Nickname
Regarding how Nietes got his nickname "Ahas" which is Tagalog for "snake," Tony Aldeguer states:

Professional career

Early years
Nietes worked as a utility man at the now-disbanded Antonio Lopez Aldeguer (ALA) boxing gym before taking up boxing after being encouraged by the practitioners with whom he socialized.

In 2003, at the age of 20, Nietes started his career as a professional boxer. On, May 22, 2004, he won the Philippines Boxing Federation (PBF) light flyweight title against Joseph Villasis via first-round technical knockout. Nietes was undefeated before losing in his bout against Angky Angkota via 10-round split decision on September 28, 2004. Angkota weighed in six pounds over the weight limit for this fight.

On November 24, 2006, Nietes won the vacant WBO Asia Pacific Minimumweight Title against Heri Amol of Indonesia via second-round knockout. He defended the title twice against Thai boxers Thongthailek Sor Tanapinyo and Sakulpan Pakdee Gym prior to world title fights in minimumweight division.

Minimumweight
On September 30, 2007, Nietes fought then undefeated Pornsawarn Kratingdaenggym of Thailand for the vacant WBO Minimumweight World Title in Waterfront-Cebu City Hotel, Cebu City, Philippines. Although Nietes floored Kratingdaenggym in the fourth round, the Thai boxer managed to get up and last until the final bell. The bout ended in a unanimous decision in favor of Nietes.

Three times, Nietes has been pitted with fighters against whom he was supposed to defend his title, however, all plans have fallen through for undisclosed reasons. Because of this, he was at risk of being stripped off his belt, as WBO rules state that a champion has to defend his title within a year. After 11 months of inactivity, he finally defended his crown, against Eddy Castro (12-3-1) on August 30, 2008. Nietes (23-1-3, with 14 knockouts) won the fight by technical knockout at 2:49 mark of the second round.

Nietes defended his title for the second time by scoring a unanimous decision victory over Erik Ramirez on February 28, 2009. En route to the win, Nietes sent Ramirez to the canvass four times in separate rounds.

In his third defense, Nietes battled interim champion Manuel Vargas on September 12, 2009. Nietes won the bout by split decision.

On January 23, 2010, Nietes was supposed to defend his WBO title for the fourth time. After a couple of opponents backed out, Mexico's Jesus Silvestre became the last resort. But because Silvestre wasn't ranked in the WBO, Nietes' title wasn't wagered and the bout was only 10 rounds. In the fight, both boxers did well and appeared strong. In the 10th and final round, Nietes was declared winner by TKO when Silvestre stopped to take a drink of water during the fight, a move that was against the rules.

In his fourth title defense, Nietes fought Mexico's Mario Rodriguez. The fight took place on August 14, 2010, at the Auditorio Luis Estrada Medina in Guasave, Sinaloa, Mexico. The Filipino pugilist won the bout by unanimous decision with scores of 119-109, 118-110 and 116-112.

Nietes was scheduled to defend his title on March 12, 2011, against mandatory challenger and former champion Raul Garcia (29-1-0). However, less than two weeks before the fight, Nietes announced that he would be vacating his world title and moving up in weight. On April 9, 2011, Nietes faced Armando Vazquez (18-5-0) and defeated him via first round knock out.

Light flyweight

On October 8, 2011, Nietes defeated Mexico's Ramón García Hirales via 12-round unanimous decision to win the WBO Light Flyweight title. Nietes defended the title on June 2, 2012 against Felipe Salguero via unanimous decision.

Nietes retained his WBO Light Flyweight title against WBO Minimumweight champion Moises Fuentes on March 2, 2013 via a majority draw.

On November 15, 2014,  the Bacolod native successfully defended his WBO and The Ring Light Flyweight titles by stopping Carlos Velarde of Mexico in the 7th round. Nietes became the longest-reigning Filipino world champion on that same day, surpassing the record previously held by Gabriel Elorde.

Flyweight
After breaking Elorde's record, Nietes successfully defended his title four more times before deciding to move up to the flyweight division. His first flyweight fight was against former WBC light flyweight champion Edgar Sosa on September 24, 2016. On April 29, 2017, Nietes became the third Filipino boxer to win world titles in three different weight divisions, along with Manny Pacquiao and Nonito Donaire when he defeated Thailand's Komgrich Nantapech. He successfully defended his title against the mandatory challenger Argentinaian and former two division world champion Juan Carlos Reveco winning via Technical Knockout after Reveco's corner throws in the towel, on the 7th round of the fight. On June 14, 2018, Nietes entered The Ring magazine's pound for pound list for the first time in his career at the number nine spot.

Junior bantamweight
Nietes made his debut in the junior-bantamweight division against Filipino compatriot Aston Palicte for the vacant WBO Super Flyweight Championship. The fight ended in a split decision draw, 118-110 for Nietes, 116-112 for Palicte and a 114-114 draw at The Forum in Inglewood, California. Punch count statistics saw Nietes, 36, land 194 punches, 70 more than Palicte, his 40 percent of punches landed was nearly twice the accuracy rate of his rival. While not beaten, Nietes was denied a victory that would have put him alongside Manny Pacquiao and Nonito Donaire as the only Asian fighters with world titles in at least four weight classes. He eventually won the same vacant title after defeating Kazuto Ioka via split decision on December 21, 2018 becoming the third Asian to win world titles in at least four weight classes.

On February 6, 2019, the WBO ordered a rematch of Nietes and Palicte after a controversial result of their first fight. On February 28, 2019, Nietes decided to vacate his WBO Junior Bantamweight title to pursue more lucrative fights in a different organization or weight class.

On April 3, 2021, Nietes fought Pablo Carillo, for the vacant WBO International junior-bantamweight title. Nietes won via unanimous decision, the scorecards were, 99-91, 98-92 and 96-95. On December 11, 2021 Nietes made his first title defense against Norbelto Jimenez at the Coca-Cola Arena, Dubai, United Arab Emirates. The fight ended in a ten-round split decision draw. The scores were 96-94 Nietes, 96-94 Jimenez and 95-95 and Nietes was able to retain his WBO International junior-bantamweight title.

On April 1, 2022, the WBO ordered Kazuto Ioka to make a mandatory title defense against Nietes. The bout was a rematch of their December 31, 2018 fight, in which Nietes won by split decision. Both parties came to an agreement a month later, and officially announced the bout for July 13, 2022. Nietes lost the fight by unanimous decision, with scores of 120–108, 118–110 and 117–111.

Professional boxing record

Titles in boxing 
Major world titles:
WBO minimumweight champion (105 lbs)
WBO light flyweight champion (108 lbs)
IBF flyweight champion (112 lbs)
WBO super flyweight champion (115 lbs)

The Ring magazine titles:
The Ring light flyweight champion (108 lbs)

Regional/International titles:
 light flyweight champion (108 lbs)
WBO Asia Pacific minimumweight champion (105 lbs)
WBO Inter-Continental flyweight champion (112 lbs)
WBO International super flyweight champion (115 lbs)

Honorary titles:
WBO Super champion

Awards and recognition
2015 Philippine Sportswriters Association (PSA) Sportsman of the Year
2014, 2015, 2016 and 2017 Gabriel "Flash" Elorde Memorial Boxer of the Year

Legacy
A statue of Nietes was built in Murcia, Negros Occidental.

See also
List of Filipino boxing world champions
List of IBF world champions
List of WBO world champions
List of The Ring world champions
List of mini-flyweight boxing champions
List of light-flyweight boxing champions
List of flyweight boxing champions
List of super-flyweight boxing champions
List of boxing quadruple champions

References

External links

Donnie Nietes - Profile, News Archive & Current Rankings at Box.Live

1982 births
Living people
Mini-flyweight boxers
Light-flyweight boxers
Flyweight boxers
Super-flyweight boxers
World mini-flyweight boxing champions
World light-flyweight boxing champions
World flyweight boxing champions
World super-flyweight boxing champions
International Boxing Federation champions
World Boxing Organization champions
The Ring (magazine) champions
Boxers from Negros Occidental
Filipino male boxers